WSRQ-FM (106.9 MHz) is a 5,000 watt radio station, located in the Florida Heartland. The station is licensed to the city of Zolfo Springs, in rural Hardee County. Its coverage area includes Hardee, DeSoto, and Highlands counties, serving the communities of Wauchula, Zolfo Springs, Arcadia, Sebring, Avon Park, and Lake Placid. Its studio facilities are near downtown Sarasota.

Since July 2005, listeners have known the station as 106.9 The Bull featuring a blend of today's best new country and all-time favorites, then La Numero 1, a Spanish language music format, until Lake Erie College of Osteopathic Medicine, Inc. of Sarasota purchased it and now simulcasts the SRQ oldies format.

Canada Calling, hosted by Prior Smith, was aired Mon-Sat at 10a from 1996.

External links
Station website
Canada Calling

SRQ-FM
Radio stations established in 1993
1993 establishments in Florida
Oldies radio stations in the United States